Artabotrys is a genus of plants in the Annonaceae family. There are over 100 species in the Old World tropics, with 31 species in Africa. It is part of the custard apple family (Annonaceae). All species are small trees or shrubs with a tendency to climb. Leaves are simple and alternate, without hairs. Bisexual flowers are borne singly or in clusters opposite the leaves. The 6-petalled flowers are scented, and the plant bears fleshy fruits.

Cultivation
Artabotrys can be propagated from fresh seeds or short half-hardened cuttings taken in spring.

Species

 Artabotrys aereus Ast
 Artabotrys antunesii Engl. & Diels
 Artabotrys arachnoides J.Sinclair
 Artabotrys atractocarpus I.M.Turner
 Artabotrys aurantiacus Engl. & Diels
 Artabotrys blumei Hook.f. & Thomson
 Artabotrys brachypetalus Benth.
 Artabotrys brevipes Craib
 Artabotrys burmanicus A.DC.
 Artabotrys byrsophyllus I.M.Turner & Utteridge
 Artabotrys cagayanensis Merr.
 Artabotrys camptopetalus Diels
 Artabotrys carnosipetalus Jessup
 Artabotrys caudatus Wall. ex Hook.f. & Thomson
 Artabotrys coccineus Keay
 Artabotrys collinus Hutch.
 Artabotrys congolensis De Wild. & T.Durand
 Artabotrys costatus King
 Artabotrys crassifolius Hook.f. & Thomson
 Artabotrys crassipetalus Pellegr.
 Artabotrys cumingianus S.Vidal
 Artabotrys dahomensis Engl. & Diels
 Artabotrys darainensis Deroin & L.Gaut.
 Artabotrys dielsianus Le Thomas
 Artabotrys fragrans Ast
 Artabotrys gossweileri Baker f.
 Artabotrys gracilis King
 Artabotrys grandifolius King
 Artabotrys hainanensis R.E.Fr.
 Artabotrys harmandii Finet & Gagnep.
 Artabotrys hexapetalus (L.f.) Bhandari
 Artabotrys hienianus Bân
 Artabotrys hildebrandtii O.Hoffm.
 Artabotrys hirtipes Ridl.
 Artabotrys hispidus Sprague & Hutch.
 Artabotrys inodorus Zipp.
 Artabotrys insignis Engl. & Diels
 Artabotrys jacques-felicis Pellegr.
 Artabotrys jollyanus Pierre
 Artabotrys kinabaluensis I.M.Turner
 Artabotrys kurzii Hook.f. & Thomson
 Artabotrys lanuginosus Boerl.
 Artabotrys lastoursvillensis Pellegr.
 Artabotrys letestui Pellegr.
 Artabotrys libericus Diels
 Artabotrys likimensis De Wild.
 Artabotrys longistigmatus Nurainas
 Artabotrys lowianus King
 Artabotrys luteus Elmer
 Artabotrys luxurians Ghesq. ex Cavaco & Keraudr.
 Artabotrys macrophyllus Hook.f.
 Artabotrys macropodus I.M.Turner
 Artabotrys madagascariensis Miq.
 Artabotrys maingayi Hook.f. & Thomson
 Artabotrys manoranjanii M.V.Ramana, J.Swamy & K.C.Mohan
 Artabotrys modestus Diels
 Artabotrys monteiroae Oliv.
 Artabotrys multiflorus C.E.C.Fisch.
 Artabotrys nicobarianus D.Das
 Artabotrys oblanceolatus Craib
 Artabotrys oblongus King
 Artabotrys ochropetalus I.M.Turner
 Artabotrys oliganthus Engl. & Diels
 Artabotrys oxycarpus King
 Artabotrys pallens Ast
 Artabotrys palustris Louis ex Boutique
 Artabotrys pandanicarpus I.M.Turner
 Artabotrys parkinsonii Chatterjee
 Artabotrys petelotii Merr.
 Artabotrys phuongianus Bân
 Artabotrys pierreanus Engl. & Diels
 Artabotrys pilosus Merr. & Chun
 Artabotrys pleurocarpus Maingay ex Hook.f. & Thomson
 Artabotrys polygynus Miq.
 Artabotrys porphyrifolius Nurainas
 Artabotrys punctulatus C.Y.Wu
 Artabotrys rhynchocarpus C.Y.Wu
 Artabotrys roseus Boerl.
 Artabotrys rufus De Wild.
 Artabotrys rupestris Diels
 Artabotrys sahyadricus Robi, K.M.P.Kumar & Hareesh
 Artabotrys sarawakensis I.M.Turner
 Artabotrys scortechinii King
 Artabotrys scytophyllus (Diels) Cavaco & Keraudren
 Artabotrys siamensis Miq.
 Artabotrys spathulatus J.Chen, Chalermglin & R.M.K.Saunders
 Artabotrys speciosus Kurz ex Hook.f. & Thomson
 Artabotrys spinosus Craib
 Artabotrys stenopetalus Engl. & Diels
 Artabotrys suaveolens (Blume) Blume
 Artabotrys sumatranus Miq.
 Artabotrys tanaosriensis J.Chen, Chalermglin & R.M.K.Saunders
 Artabotrys taynguyenensis Bân
 Artabotrys tetramerus Bân
 Artabotrys thomsonii Oliv.
 Artabotrys tipulifer I.M.Turner & Utteridge
 Artabotrys tomentosus Nurainas
 Artabotrys uniflorus (Griff.) Craib
 Artabotrys vanprukii Craib
 Artabotrys veldkampii I.M.Turner
 Artabotrys velutinus Scott Elliot
 Artabotrys venustus King
 Artabotrys vidalianus Elmer
 Artabotrys vietnamensis Bân
 Artabotrys vinhensis Ast
 Artabotrys wrayi King
 Artabotrys zeylanicus Hook.f. & Thomson

Synonyms
 Artabotrys odoratissimus, synonym for Artabotrys hexapetalus  
 Artabotrys uncinatus , synonym for Artabotrys hexapetalus (L. f.) Bhandari

References

Lord, Tony (2003) Flora : The Gardener's Bible : More than 20,000 garden plants from around the world. London: Cassell. 
Botanica Sistematica
www.prioryplants.co.uk/81/SouthAfricanplants.aspx

Annonaceae
Annonaceae genera